Blackfoot is a hamlet in east-central Alberta, Canada within the County of Vermilion River.

History 
The first post office opened in 1905 as "Blackfoot Hills" and changed to just "Blackfoot" in 1909.  Telephone service was established in 1907.

Demographics 

The County of Vermilion River's 2015 municipal census counted a population of 420 in Blackfoot.

See also 
List of communities in Alberta
List of designated places in Alberta
List of hamlets in Alberta

References 

Hamlets in Alberta
Designated places in Alberta
County of Vermilion River